Whitbread is a multinational hotel, coffee shop and restaurant company headquartered in Dunstable, United Kingdom.

Whitbread may also refer to:

People with the surname
 Adrian Whitbread (born 1971), former professional footballer
 Barry Whitbread (born c. 1949), football coach
 Fatima Whitbread (born 1961), English former javelin thrower and multiple medal-winner
 Gary Whitbread (1957–2011), English cricketer
 James Whitbread Lee Glaisher (1848–1928), English mathematician
 Peter Whitbread (1928–2004), English actor and screenwriter
 Samuel Whitbread (1720–1796), English brewer and Member of Parliament
 Samuel Whitbread (1764–1815), English politician
 Samuel Whitbread (1830–1915), English brewer and Liberal politician
 Thomas Whitbread (1618–1679), English Jesuit missionary.
 Tony Whitbread, Chief Executive of Sussex Wildlife Trust
 Zak Whitbread (born 1984), American association football player

See also
 Whitbread Round the World Race, former name of the Volvo Ocean Race sailing race
 Whitbread 60, a class of racing designed for this race, now known as the Volvo Ocean 60
 Whitbread Book Awards, former name of the Costa Book Awards
 Samuel Whitbread Academy, a school
 Whitbread Engine, one of the first rotative steam engines